Triodontopyga is a genus of parasitic flies in the family Tachinidae. There are about nine described species in Triodontopyga.

Species
These nine species belong to the genus Triodontopyga:
 Triodontopyga flavolimbata (Bigot, 1889)
 Triodontopyga friburguensis Guimaraes, 1983
 Triodontopyga lenkoi Guimaraes, 1983
 Triodontopyga montei Guimaraes, 1983
 Triodontopyga obscurata Guimaraes, 1983
 Triodontopyga tridens Townsend, 1927
 Triodontopyga trinitatis Thompson, 1963
 Triodontopyga vibrissata Guimaraes, 1983
 Triodontopyga vorax (Wiedemann, 1830)

References

Further reading

 
 
 
 

Tachinidae
Articles created by Qbugbot